Alisher Tukhtaev (born 17 December 1975) is a retired Tajikistani footballer who played for the Tajikistan national football team and current Interim Head Coach of FC Istiklol.

Career

Managerial
On 22 May 2018 Tukhtaev was appointed as acting Head Coach of FC Istiklol after the resignation of Mukhsin Mukhamadiev.

On 27 June 2019, Tukhtaev was again appointed as acting Head Coach of FC Istiklol, this time after the resignation of Khakim Fuzailov.

Following the appointment of Vitaliy Levchenko as Istiklol's new manager on 17 February 2020, Tukhtaev returned to his role as assistant manager.

On 27 June 2022, Tukhtaev was once again put in Interim Charge of Istiklol following the expiration of Vitaly Levchenko's contract.

Career statistics

International

International Goals

Managerial
 Only competitive matches are counted.

Honours
Sitora Dushanbe
Tajik League (2): 1993, 1994
Tajik Cup (1): 1993
Dynamo Dushanbe
Tajik League (1): 1996
Regar-TadAZ
Tajik League (2): 2006, 2007
Tajik Cup (1): 2000, 2005, 2006

References

External links

1975 births
Living people
Tajikistani footballers
Tajikistani expatriate footballers
Tajikistan international footballers
Association football midfielders
Expatriate footballers in Vietnam
Tajikistani expatriate sportspeople in Vietnam
Expatriate footballers in Kazakhstan
Tajikistani expatriate sportspeople in Kazakhstan